was a Shugodai of Oki Province in the Kamakura period. He was the founder of the Takaoka clan in Izumo Province, Japan.

Takaoka Muneyasu was the 8th son of Sasaki Yasukiyo. His mother was Kasai Kiyochika's daughter. Muneyasu was Enya Yoriyasu's younger brother.

He was originally named Minamoto no Muneyasu. His alias was "Takaoka Hachirō" or "Sasaki Hachirō". His wife was from the Ii clan (Izumo Province). His official rank was Saemonnojyō. His family crest was Hana-wachigai (Shippō-ni-hanakaku).

Brief history 
1274 (Kōchō 11 December of moon calendar): Because Mongol had attacked it, he became a soldier of foreign enemy defense (Ikoku-keigo ban-yaku), and he went to Coast of Kurosaki, Chikuzen Province.
1277 (Kenji 3 April of moon calendar): He became an acting governor in Oki Province (to one theory governor in Oki Province).
1287(Kōan 10th): The territory Takaoka-mura, Enya-no-sato, Izumo Province, ingot was succeeded among his father Yasukiyo's inheritances. Therefore, he became a clan name "Takaoka" for the first time.
1305 (Kagen 3rd): When Hōjō Munekata was revolted (The Kakitsu War), he attacked rebels running after by the Shōgun instruction.
1326 (Karyaku 1st): On August 13 he died at age 71. His posthumous Buddhist name was "Kakunen".

References

See also 
Genji clan
Sasaki clan
Takaoka clan
Battle of Bun'ei
Battle of Kōan
Mongol Invasions of Japan

People of Kamakura-period Japan
Samurai
Japanese Buddhist clergy
Kamakura period Buddhist clergy
1255 births
1326 deaths